Dil Rangeela is a 2014 Indian Kannada-language romantic comedy film directed and scripted by Preetham Gubbi. The film stars Ganesh, Rachita Ram and Priyanka Rao. K. Manju produced the film under his production banner K. Manju Cinemaas. The film marks the return of Ganesh and Gubbi together after their previous film Maleyali Jotheyali (2009). The original score and soundtrack for the movie were produced by Arjun Janya.

Released on 7 March 2014, the film was screened in around 125 theaters across Karnataka.

Plot 
Anuradha (Priyanka Rao), daughter of hotel owner (Achyuth Kumar), is in love with hotel chef Preetham (Ganesh). On his visit to Goa, Preetham meets Khushi (Rachita Ram) who impresses him. He helps Khushi get over her failed romance with Vicky. On the other side, Anuradha is preparing for her engagement with Preetham. On the day of the engagement, Anuradha misbehaves with Preetham's mother. This makes him to leave her and come back to Khushi. The story takes a curious turn when he sees Khushi with her estranged boyfriend. He then gets drunk. Anuradha arrives to beach with 'her friend Khushi who reveals that Vicky had come with his mother to invite her to his wedding and not to propose her. Both reunite.

Cast 
 Ganesh as Preetham
 Rachita Ram
 Priyanka Rao
 Rangayana Raghu
 Achyuth Kumar
 Yamuna Srinidhi
 Jayashree

Production 
The film, its cast and crew were announced on the auspicious day of Ganesha Chaturthi at a temple in Bangalore. It was also reported that the filming would take place in Bangalore, Mysore and Goa while the songs would be shot abroad. The first excerpt from the film was released early in January 2014.

Soundtrack 
The film's audio release was held at Chancery Pavilion in Bangalore in the presence of several celebrities including the lead star Ganesh and his wife Shilpa and the lead actresses. Actresses Amulya, Sanjjanaa, the film producer K. Manju, composer Arjun Janya were also present. It was earlier reported that the singer Ankit Tiwari would make his South Indian debut with a song for this film.

Track list

Reception

Critical response 

The Times of India scored the film at 3.5 out of 5 stars and says "Ganesh excels in a role that suits him well. Ruchitha Ram is brilliant in her expression and dialogue delivery. Priyanka Rao should improve her dialogue delivery. Music by Arjun Janya is okay. But H C Venu’s camerawork is marvellous, especially in the opening shot." Shyam Prasad S of Bangalore Mirror scored the film at 3 out of 5 stars and says "Since the standard of film songs in Kannada has risen several notches in the last few years, the fact that there are only two hit songs in the film could be a let-down for some. Overall, the film is a good watch and won’t disappoint anyone searching for two hours of good time."Sify wrote "Camera by HC Venu spans across the beautiful locations and is surely an amazing part of the movie, while the musical score by Arjun Janya are an added advantage to the movie. The movie is near to perfect as a weekend entertainer."

References

External links 

 Dil Rangeela at RAAGA
 Dil Rangeela information

2014 films
2010s Kannada-language films
2014 romantic comedy films
Indian romantic comedy films
Films scored by Arjun Janya
Films directed by Preetham Gubbi